The papal tiara is the crown worn by popes of the Catholic Church for centuries, until 1978 when Pope John Paul I declined a coronation, opting instead for an inauguration. The tiara is still used as a symbol of the papacy. It features on the coat of arms of the Holy See and of the Vatican City State, though not on the pope's personal coat of arms since Pope Benedict XVI replaced the tiara on his official coat of arms with a traditional bishop's mitre. A tiara is used to crown a  statue of Saint Peter in St. Peter's Basilica every year on his feast day.

Popes commissioned tiaras from jewelers or received them as gifts, with a number remaining in the possession of the Holy See. In 1798, French troops occupied Rome and stole or destroyed all but one of the papal tiaras held by the Holy See. Since then popes have used or received as gifts more than twenty tiaras. Several were never worn by a pope, notably those presented as gifts since the last papal coronation in 1963.

List of papal tiaras still in existence

Notes

References

Additional sources
 Edward Twining (Lord Twining), A History of the Crown Jewels of Europe, London: B.T. Batsford, 1960.
 Edward Twining (Lord Twining), European Regalia, London: B.T. Batsford, 1967.

 
Papal tiaras
Tiaras
Tiaras
Tiaras
Papal tiaras